Hugo of Montcada i Gralla was the commander of the Galleasses of the Spanish Armada. He was the second son of Francesc I de Montcada, first Marquess of Aitona and Count of Osona, and his wife, Lucrècia Gralla.

Belonging to the noble family of Montcada, his brother Gastó of Montcada i Gralla (first-born of 17 children) inherited the immense family fortune. His other brother was Joan of Montcada i Gralla, Archbishop of Tarragona ( 1613 - 1622 ) and Bishop of Barcelona ( 1610-1612 ).

Participation in the Invincible Armada

Charge 
Hugo of Montcada was appointed commander of the fleet of Naples. The flagship was the San Lorenzo Galleass. The Galleass-galleon La Girona was part of that fleet. The four Galleasses were:

 The San Lorenzo (captain-ship of the fleet of Naples) -Captain Joan Setantí.
 The Zúñiga (patron-ship of the fleet of Naples) -Captain Pere Centelles
The Girona -Captain Fabrizio Spínola, Genoese.
 The Napolitana -Captain Perrucchio Morán

Galleass San Lorenzo 
This ship had 124 sailors, 50 guns, 300 oarsmen and 270 soldiers.

It was built in Naples. It displaced 762 tones and was the largest ship and, according to some, the most splendid of the entire army.

Nautical difficulties 
One of the most difficult variables that made navigating the British Channel so dangerous were (and still are) the currents caused by the tides. Local pilots had good knowledge of those currents.

Battle actions 

 According to various testimonials (documentaries and film documentaries), the San Lorenzo Galleass could not progress rowing against the current caused by the tide.
 The Duke of Medina Sidonia denied Hugo of Montcada permission to attack the Ark Royal ship, when she was within his reach and in conditions of superiority.
 San Lorenzo was the first ship that warned of the danger of the eight ships sent by Drake against the anchored Spanish navy .
 The order of the Duke of Medina Sidonia, to cut the chains of the anchors of all the ships of the army, caused chaos and many collisions between them.

Final disaster 
The references to the fact are numerous and not always coincident. 

In the confusion brought about by the collisions, a shock rendered unusable the rudder of San Lorenzo. The maneuver with the oars was not sufficiently agile to fight under the attack of the enemies (from the Ark Royal in particular). Hugo of Montcada decided to go to refuge in the port of Calais (under French control and, in theory, neutral). He did not reach the entrance by sailing and the oars, the Galleass tried to enter the port of Calais but bog down near the entrance. Being half lying sideways. The soldiers (probably terrified by the incident) deserted the ship, jumping to the water. Many of them were drowned. Only a few faithful remained aboard.

The English, sent a few boats with soldiers to seize the galleass. Finally Howard sent a reinforcement with the Ark Royal's Panescalm boat and could reduce the last resistance. Hugo of Montcada was shot down with an arquebus shot in his head, and Joan Setantí and other Catalans defenders died as well.

Important testimonial 
According to the work "Armada Invencible", by Cesáreo Fernández Duro, there is a description of the final attack and the death of Hugo of Montcada according to the statements of a slave of the Marquis de Santa Cruz (Volume I, page 118, document K.1467, item 18).

See also
 Spanish Armada in Ireland
 List of Ships of the Spanish Armada

References

External links

 The Story of the Tobermory Spanish Galleon
 The Defeat of the Spanish Armada. Insight into the context, personalities, planning and consequences. Wes Ulm
 English translation of Francisco de Cuellar's account of his service in the Armada and on the run in Ireland
 Elizabeth I and the Spanish Armada – a learning resource and teachers notes from the British Library
 The story of the Armada battles with pictures from the House of Lords tapestries
 BBC-ZDF etc. TV coproduction Natural History of Europe
 Discovery Civilization Battlefield Detectives – What Sank The Armada?

Spanish Armada
Spanish naval officers